The Alphonso Ford EuroLeague Top Scorer Trophy, also known as the EuroLeague Best Scorer, is an annual basketball award of Europe's premier level league, the Turkish Airlines EuroLeague. It is given to the Top Scorer throughout the EuroLeague season, up until the Turkish Airlines EuroLeague Final Four stage of the season. The award, under its current name, began in the 2004–05 season, and is named after the late Alphonso Ford, who was one of the greatest scorers in EuroLeague history.

Since the Alphonso Ford award has been given out (2004–05 season onward), a player could average the most points during the EuroLeague full season competition, and not win the award, since it is only counted for games up to the EuroLeague Final Four. Prior to the 2004–05 season, the EuroLeague's Top Scorer was recorded statistically, but it was called the EuroLeague Top Scorer award.

EuroLeague Top Scorers (1992–2004)

 Player nationalities by national team.

Multiple EuroLeague Top Scorers (1992–2004)

Alphonso Ford Trophy winners and Top Scorers (2005–present)

Beginning with the 2004–05 season, the EuroLeague awards the Alphonso Ford Trophy, in memorial of the late Alphonso Ford, to the player with the highest scoring average before the EuroLeague Final Four takes place. Because of this, it is still possible for a player to lead the league in scoring, but not win the Alphonso Ford Trophy. This happened during the 2006–07 season, when Igor Rakočević won the Alphonso Ford Trophy, but Juan Carlos Navarro was the league's top scorer.

Navarro had the highest full season scoring average in the EuroLeague, at 16.8 points per game, but did not win the Alphonso Ford Trophy, because he did not have the highest scoring average prior to the start of the EuroLeague Final Four. So instead, Rakočević was given the trophy, despite actually finishing second in the full season scoring statistical category, with an average of 16.2 points per game.
 Player nationalities by national team.

Notes:
  Juan Carlos Navarro was the Top Scorer of the 2006–07 season, while  Igor Rakočević was the Alphonso Ford Trophy winner.
 There was no awarding in the 2019–20, because the season was cancelled due to the coronavirus pandemic in Europe.

Honors since the 2004–05 season

Players

Player nationality

Teams

References

External links
 

EuroLeague statistics
EuroLeague awards and honors
European basketball awards